Garston railway station may refer to:
Garston railway station (Hertfordshire)
Garston railway station (Merseyside)